According to the Book of Mormon, Sariah was the wife of Lehi, and the mother of Laman, Lemuel, Sam, and Nephi.  The Book of Mormon also mentions Jacob, and Joseph, two additional sons born to Lehi after his departure from Jerusalem, but does not explicitly name Sariah as their mother, though no other wife of Lehi is ever named.  She traveled with her husband from Jerusalem, into the wilderness, and eventually, across the ocean to the "promised land" (the Americas).  She is perhaps best known for the story in First Nephi where she complains against her husband for sending her sons back to Jerusalem.  She becomes convinced that they have perished in the desert, but is overjoyed upon their eventual return.  In Lehi's vision of the tree of life, Sariah eats the precious fruit, symbolizing that she is righteous and will be saved.

Family tree
As the wife of Lehi, and the mother of Nephi and Laman (who went on to establish the nations of the Nephites and the Lamanites), Sariah can be considered one of the principal ancestors of the Book of Mormon people.  Her immediate family is shown in the diagram below.

Etymology
Among LDS linguists, prevalent consensus of the reading of the name "Sariah" is שׂריה Śaryāh ("princess of Jehovah"), and an alternative voicing of the name Seraiah.

References

Book of Mormon people
Mormonism and women